Karl-Heinz Ripkens (born 9 December 1937) is a German former footballer who played as a forward. He started his career at 1. FC Köln, winning two championships with the club before moving to Belgian side Standard Liège in 1964. He returned to Germany after one season and went on to play for Bayer Leverkusen, Viktoria Köln and Fortuna Köln.

Honours
1. FC Köln
 German football championship: 1961–62
 Bundesliga: 1963–64

References

External links
 

1937 births
Living people
German footballers
Association football forwards
1. FC Köln players
Bundesliga players
Standard Liège players
Bayer 04 Leverkusen players
FC Viktoria Köln players
SC Fortuna Köln players
German expatriate footballers
German expatriate sportspeople in Belgium
Expatriate footballers in Belgium